The 10th IAAF World Indoor Championships in Athletics under the auspices of the International Association of Athletics Federations (IAAF) were held in the Budapest Arena, Hungary between March 5 and March 7, 2004. A total off 139 countries were represented by 677 athletes at the championships.

It was the second visit of the championships to Budapest having previously visited there 15 years earlier in 1989. The newly built 13,000 capacity arena was built on the site of a former stadium that was destroyed by fire in 1999.

This was the last World Indoor Championships where the 200 m event was contested. The event was discontinued as the tight bends involved in running indoors left athletes drawn to run on the inside lanes with minimal or no chance of winning.

Results

Men
2001 | 2003 | 2004 | 2006 | 2008

Women
2001 | 2003 | 2004 | 2006 | 2008

Medal table

Participating nations

 (2)
 (2)
 (1)
 (1)
 (8)
 (3)
 (9)
 (3)
 (1)
 (16)
 (11)
 (1)
 (1)
 (2)
 (10)
 (7)
 (1)
 (1)
 (3)
 (10)
 (1)
 (1)
 (1)
 (1)
 (9)
 (1)
 (1)
 (3)
 (11)
 (2)
 (11)
 (2)
 (2)
 (2)
 (1)
 (2)
 (7)
 (1)
 (6)
 (25)
 (2)
 (21)
 (3)
 (25)
 (19)
 (1)
 (1)
 (1)
 (1)
 (1)
 (17)
 (2)
 (1)
 (1)
 (13)
 (1)
 (14)
 (24)
 (3)
 (1)
 (3)
 (6)
 (1)
 (1)
 (3)
 (1)
 (1)
 (2)
 (2)
 (1)
 (1)
 (1)
 (1)
 (1)
 (1)
 (1)
 (1)
 (2)
 (1)
 (1)
 (1)
 (10)
 (1)
 (2)
 (1)
 (11)
 (2)
 (1)
 (3)
 (1)
 (1)
 (1)
 (1)
 (1)
 (1)
 (1)
 (1)
 (18)
 (8)
 (2)
 (1)
 (18)
 (50)
 (1)
 (1)
 (1)
 (1)
 (1)
 (1)
 (1)
 (2)
 (1)
 (1)
 (1)
 (1)
 (9)
 (1)
 (4)
 (1)
 (32)
 (3)
 (16)
 (5)
 (1)
 (2)
 (1)
 (1)
 (3)
 (1)
 (1)
 (1)
 (2)
 (23)
 (48)
 (1)
 (1)
 (1)
 (1)
 (1)

References

External links
 IAAF Official website

 
IAAF World Indoor Championships
IAAF World Indoor Championships
World Athletics Indoor Championships
International athletics competitions hosted by Hungary
March 2004 sports events in Europe
2000s in Budapest
International sports competitions in Budapest